Eupithecia filia is a moth in the family Geometridae. It is found in Nepal.

The wingspan is about 17.5 mm. The forewings are brown and yellow and the hindwings are lighter whitish brown.

References

Moths described in 2010
filia
Moths of Asia